Rorden Wilkinson FAcSS FRSA (born 13 February 1970) is a British academic and author. He is Deputy Vice-Chancellor (Academic) and Professor of International Political Economy at Macquarie University, Sydney, Australia. He was previously Pro Vice-Chancellor (Education and Student Experience) and Professor of International Political Economy at the University of New South Wales, Sydney, Australia; Deputy Pro Vice-Chancellor (Education and Innovation), Professor of Global Political Economy, and a Fellow of the UK Trade Policy Observatory at the University of Sussex; and Professor of International Political Economy and Research Director of the Brooks World Poverty Institute at the University of Manchester. He did his doctoral work and began his academic career at the University of Auckland, New Zealand. He has been a visiting scholar at Brown University, USA, Wellesley College, USA, and the Australian National University.

Biography
Rorden graduated from the University of Liverpool with an undergraduate degree in economics and economic history and from the University of Kent with a master's degree in international relations. He obtained his PhD from the University of Auckland in 1997.

He is a political economist working in the fields of international development and international political economy with a focus on global governance and international trade (notably the World Trade Organization).

From 2002 to 2021 he and Thomas G. Weiss co-edited the Global Institutions book series for the commercial publisher Routledge. He is a Fellow of the Academy of Social Sciences and the Royal Society of Arts, and a member of the editorial board of the international public policy journal Global Governance. He is a past vice president of the International Studies Association and was the 2014 recipient of the International Studies Association Society for Women in International Political Economy mentoring award.

Published works

Authored books 

 Thomas G. Weiss and Rorden Wilkinson, Rethinking Global Governance, Cambridge: Polity, 2019
 Rorden Wilkinson, What's Wrong with the WTO and How to Fix it, Cambridge: Polity, 2014
 Rorden Wilkinson, The WTO: Crisis and the Governance of Global Trade, London and New York: Routledge, 2006
 Rorden Wilkinson, Multilateralism and the World Trade Organisation: the architecture and extension of international trade regulation, London and New York: Routledge, 2000

Edited books 

 Thomas G. Weiss and Rorden Wilkinson (eds.), Global Governance Futures. London and New York: Routledge, 2022
 Thomas G. Weiss and Rorden Wilkinson (eds.), International Organization and Global Governance. London and New York: Routledge, 2018 (second edition)
 Synne L. Dyvik, Jan Selby and Rorden Wilkinson (eds.), What's the Point of International Relations. London and New York: Routledge, 2017
 Thomas G. Weiss and Rorden Wilkinson (eds.), International Organization and Global Governance. London and New York: Routledge, 2013
 Rorden Wilkinson and David Hulme (eds), The Millennium Development Goals and Beyond. London and New York: Routledge, 2012
 Rorden Wilkinson and James Scott (eds.), Trade, Poverty, Development. London and New York: Routledge, 2012
 Jennifer Clapp and Rorden Wilkinson (eds.), Global Governance, Poverty and Inequality. Global Institutions. London and New York: Routledge, 2010
 Mark Bevir, Colin Hay, Naomi Choi, Andy Smith, Rorden Wilkinson, Lisa Zanetti, Chris Ansell (eds.), The Encyclopedia of Governance. Sage, 2007
 Donna Lee and Rorden Wilkinson (eds.), The WTO after Hong Kong: progress in, and prospects for, the Doha Development Agenda. London and New York: Routledge, 2007
 Rorden Wilkinson (ed), The Global Governance Reader. London and New York, Routledge, 2005
 Rorden Wilkinson and Steve Hughes (eds.), Global Governance: Critical Perspectives, London and New York: Routledge, 2002
 Rorden Wilkinson (ed.), Culture, Ethnicity and Human Rights in International Relations, Auckland: NZIIA, 1996

References

External links 
 sussex.ac.uk

1970 births
Living people
Alumni of the University of Liverpool
Alumni of the University of Kent
University of Auckland alumni
International relations scholars
Academics of the University of Manchester
Academics of the University of Sussex
Academic staff of the University of New South Wales
Fellows of the Academy of Social Sciences